The 1957 Auburn Tigers football team was an American football team that represented Auburn University in the Southeastern Conference (SEC) during the 1957 NCAA University Division football season. In their seventh season under head coach Ralph "Shug" Jordan, the Tigers compiled a perfect 10–0 record (7–0 in the SEC), shut out six of ten opponents, won the SEC championship, and outscored all opponents by a total of 207 to 28.

The national championship was split with Auburn No. 1 in the AP Poll and Ohio State, despite one loss, ranked No. 1 by the UPI coaches poll, Football Writers Association of America and International News Service. In later analyses, Auburn was chosen as national champion by the majority of selectors, including the Billingsley Report, College Football Researchers Association, Helms Athletic Foundation, National Championship Foundation, Poling System, Sagarin Ratings, and Williamson System.

Auburn end Jimmy Phillips was a consensus first-team pick on the 1957 All-America college football team. Phillips and fellow end Jerry Wilson were both selected as first-team picks on the 1957 All-SEC football team. Center Jackie Burkett, tackle Ben Preston, and back Bill Atkins were named to the All-SEC second team.

Schedule

Roster

 Bill Atkins, back
 Tim Baker, guard
 Jackie Burkett, center
 Bobby Hoppe, halfback
 James Jeffrey, offensive lineman
 Tommy Lorino, halfback
 Tommy Lorton, back
 Lloyd Nix, quarterback
 Ken Paduch, offensive/defensive lineman
 Jimmy Phillips, end
 Ben Preston, tackle
 Ronnie Robbs, fullback
 Zeke Smith, guard
 Jerry Wilson, end

References

Auburn
Auburn Tigers football seasons
College football national champions
Southeastern Conference football champion seasons
College football undefeated seasons
Auburn Tigers football